Wang Xuanfu (王玄甫), also known as Wang Cheng (王誠), is a legendary Taoist of the Han Dynasty, who became immortal at the age of 256, under the name of "Lord of the Young Yang of the Purple Office" (紫府少陽君). He is sometimes equated with the god Donghua (東華帝君), in which case he is made a character of the Zhou dynasty. Considered the master of Zhongli Quan to whom he would have transmitted alchemical secrets and the technique of the sword of the black dragon (青龍劍法), he is one of the Five Ancestors of the North of the  Quanzhen current and was titled by the Yuan emperors.

He is said to be from Donghai (東海), now Yanzhou in Shandong. As a disciple of the immortal of the White Clouds (白雲上真), he was said to have been a hermit in the magical caves of the Kunlun, Wutai and Zhongnan (終南山) mountains, the latter frequented by the apparitions of Wang Chongyang, founder of Quanzhen. He is sometimes depicted as a wandering vindicator carrying a pair of flying swords on his back that can accomplish their mission on their own and then return to their scabbard. His divine birthdays on 15 of the 6th month (birth) and 16 of the 10th  month (achievement of immortality).

References

Taoist immortals